Henry Chandler Egan (August 21, 1884 – April 5, 1936) was an American amateur golfer and golf course architect of the early 20th century.

Early life and college
Egan was born in Chicago, Illinois, which at the end of the 19th century was the epicenter of golf in the United States — the first 18-hole golf course in the country, the Chicago Golf Club, in Wheaton, was built there in 1895. Egan played his first game of golf in Lake Geneva, Wisconsin at the age of 12. He attended secondary school at the Rugby School in Kenilworth, and was a star football player on its team. The school did not have a golf team, so Chandler developed his golf game at his father's club, Exmoor Country Club. He was accepted to Harvard University, where he soon became the captain of the college golf team. The team won three team NCAA Division I Men's Golf Championships from 1902 to 1904, and Egan won the individual title in 1902.

Championships and Olympics
Egan won his first non-collegiate tournament in the 1902 Western Amateur, which was played at the Chicago Golf Club. Not only was the tournament played in his home metropolitan area, but the runner-up was his cousin Walter Egan. A year later, the Egan cousins switched places with Walter winning and Chandler coming in second, and Chandler Egan would win the tournament again in 1904, 1905 (with Walter again the runner-up), and 1907.

In 1904, Egan achieved the pinnacle of U.S. amateur golf success by winning the U.S. Amateur, played at Baltusrol Golf Club in New Jersey. He successfully defended his title a year later at his home turf of the Chicago Golf Club.

Egan appeared to be peaking at the right time to also win an individual gold medal at the 1904 Summer Olympics, which featured golf for the last time in 1904. While Egan's U.S. team (which also included cousin Walter) won team gold, Egan had to settle for individual silver, as he was defeated by Canadian George Lyon, who at 46, was more than twice Egan's age. Egan later admitted he had been outclassed by the wily Lyon, whose massive drives forced Egan out of his usual game.

Move to Oregon
Following his runner-up finish in the 1909 U.S. Amateur, Egan abruptly disappeared from competition. He reemerged on the competitive golf circuit in 1914, with a runner-up finish in the Pacific Northwest Amateur championship to Jack Neville. A year later, Egan and Neville would meet again, and this time, Egan was the winner. He would win the Pacific Northwest Amateur four more times, in 1920, 1923, 1925, and 1932. Egan traveled south to win the California State Amateur in 1926. He played on two U.S. championship Walker Cup teams in 1930 and 1934.

Golf architecture
In the 1910s, Egan moved into golf course design, designing such notable Oregon courses as the Eugene Country Club, Eastmoreland Golf Course, Oswego Lake Country Club, Riverside Golf & Country Club, Tualatin Country Club, and Waverley Country Club. In 1929, Egan partnered with legendary golf architect Alister MacKenzie to renovate Pebble Beach Golf Links for the 1929 U.S. Amateur, in which Egan played and reached the semifinals. In 1929 Egan also aided MacKenzie and Hunter during the design and construction of The Union League Golf and Country Club, now known as Green Hills Country Club in Millbrae, California.  After Seth Raynor submitted plans to re-design Sequoyah Country Club in Oakland, California just prior his death in 1926, it was Egan who ultimately did a 1930 re-design there. He designed the Indian Canyon municipal course in Spokane, Washington in 1930, which opened in 1935.

Death and legacy
In 1936, Egan had completed plans for West Seattle Golf Course in Seattle, and was working on the half-finished Legion Memorial Golf Course in nearby Everett in late March. He came down with lobar pneumonia, was hospitalized for nearly a week, and died. His funeral was held in Seattle and he was buried in Medford.

Egan was named to the Pacific Northwest Golf Association Hall of Fame in 1985, and the Oregon Sports Hall of Fame in 1990.

Egan's Olympic medals were discovered after the death of his daughter in 2012. They went on display in 2016 at the USGA Museum, Oakmont Country Club during the U.S. Open and the World Golf Hall of Fame.

Golf courses designed
Egan designed the following golf courses:
 Bend Golf & Country Club Bend, Oregon (original nine) 
 Watson Ranch Golf Club, Coos Bay, Oregon
 Eastmoreland Golf Course, Portland, Oregon
 Eugene Country Club, Eugene, Oregon
 Hood River Golf & Country Club, Hood River, Oregon
 Indian Canyon, Spokane, Washington
 Oswego Lake Country Club, Lake Oswego, Oregon
 Pacific Grove Municipal Golf Course, Pacific Grove, California (original nine)
 North Fulton Golf Course, Atlanta, Georgia
 Reames Golf & Country Club, Klamath Falls, Oregon
 Riverside Golf & Country Club, Portland, Oregon (front nine)
 Seaside Golf Club, Seaside, Oregon
 The Oaks at Rogue Valley Country Club, Medford, Oregon
 Plantation Country Club, Boise, Idaho
 The Rogue at Rogue Valley Country Club, Medford, Oregon
 Tualatin Country Club, Tualatin, Oregon
 Legion Memorial Golf Course, Everett, Washington
 Waverley Country Club, Portland, Oregon
 West Seattle Golf Club, Seattle, Washington
 Egan aided Alister MacKenzie and Robert Hunter during the construction of The Union League Golf and Country Club, which is now Green Hills Country Club in Millbrae, California in 1929. 
 Egan, along with Robert Hunter, was a construction assistant to Alister Mackenzie on Sharp Park Golf Course, Pacifica, California (1932) Sharp Park is one of MacKenzie's few municipal courses, and his only public seaside links.
 Baywood Golf & Country Club, Arcata, California

Tournament wins
1902 NCAA Division I Men's Golf Championships (individual and team), Western Amateur
1903 NCAA Division I Men's Golf Championships (team)
1904 NCAA Division I Men's Golf Championships (team), Western Amateur, U.S. Amateur
1905 Western Amateur, U.S. Amateur
1907 Western Amateur
1915 Pacific Northwest Amateur
1920 Pacific Northwest Amateur
1923 Pacific Northwest Amateur
1925 Pacific Northwest Amateur
1926 California State Amateur, Bahamas Amateur
1932 Pacific Northwest Amateur

Amateur major championships

Wins (2)

Results timeline

M = Medalist
LA = Low amateur
NYF = Tournament not yet founded
NT = No tournament
DNP = Did not play
"T" indicates a tie for a place
DNQ = Did not qualify for match play portion
R64, R32, R16, QF, SF = Round in which player lost in match play
Green background for wins. Yellow background for top-10

Source for U.S. Open and U.S. Amateur: USGA Championship Database

Source for 1934 British Amateur: The Glasgow Herald, May 22, 1934, pg. 10.

U.S. national team appearances
Walker Cup: 1930 (winners), 1934 (winners)

See also
H. Chandler and Alice B. Egan House

References

External links

Oregon Golf Association – H. Chandler Egan
Golf's Grand Old Master – H. Chandler Egan
Cybergolf.com – favorite designers – H. Chandler Egan – by Tony Dear

American male golfers
Amateur golfers
Harvard Crimson men's golfers
Golfers at the 1904 Summer Olympics
Olympic gold medalists for the United States in golf
Olympic silver medalists for the United States in golf
Medalists at the 1904 Summer Olympics
Golf course architects
Golfers from Chicago
Golfers from Oregon
Deaths from pneumonia in Washington (state)
Sportspeople from Chicago
Sportspeople from Medford, Oregon
1884 births
1936 deaths